Mario Aparicio Muñoz (born 23 April 2000) is a Spanish cyclist, who currently rides for UCI ProTeam .

Major results
2017
 1st Stage 3 
 3rd Road race, National Junior Road Championships

References

External links

2000 births
Living people
Spanish male cyclists
Cyclists from Castile and León
Sportspeople from the Province of Burgos